Absentee or The Absentee may refer to:

Absentee (band), a British band
The Absentee, a novel by Maria Edgeworth, published in 1812 in Tales of Fashionable Life
The Absentee (1915 film), a 1915 American silent film directed by Christy Cabanne
The Absentee (1951 film), a 1951 Mexican film directed by Julio Bracho
The Absentee (1989 film), a 1989 Argentine film
Absentee (album), an album from Pitch Black Forecast

See also
Absenteeism
Absentee ballot
Absentee landlord
Absentee-Shawnee Tribe of Indians
Present absentee